The terms "Burns Fellowship" and "Burns Fellow" have several applications around the world:
Arthur F. Burns Fellowship for United States journalists with German language skills, organized by the International Center for Journalists
Robert Burns Fellowship, University of Otago - a New Zealand literary fellowship based in the nation's most Scottish city
Vancouver Burns Fellowship - founded in 1924, including among its aims the erection of a statue of Burns (which happened only 4 years later in Stanley Park)